Belinda McClory (born 1968) is an Australian film, television and stage actress, mainly known for her role as Switch in The Matrix.

McClory was born in Adelaide, Australia. Her father was a police officer, giving her insight to the life of a cop and their family. On 30 January 1999 she married director Jon Hewitt. She received a Helpmann Award for Best Female Actor in a Supporting Role in a Play for her role in the 2004 Australian production of Frozen.

Filmography

Film

Television

Theatre
 Frozen (2004)
 The Modern International Dead (2009)
Edward II (2016)
My Sister Feather (2018)

References

External links
 

1968 births
Australian film actresses
Australian television actresses
Helpmann Award winners
Living people
Actresses from Adelaide
20th-century Australian actresses
21st-century Australian actresses
Australian women screenwriters